, formerly known by her ring name , is a Japanese female mixed martial artist and kickboxer. Her former nickname comes from the V1 armlock wrestling move.

Yamaguchi currently fights as a lightweight in the Jewels promotion. She has a notable victory over Yuka Tsuji and was the final Valkyrie Featherweight Champion. She is currently ranked #5 in the ONE Championship Women's Atomweight rankings.

On , Yamaguchi announced that she would begin competing as a freelance fighter and changed her ring name to V.V.

Early life
While living in Los Angeles, California, she studied some of her elementary school years before returning to Japan. She also studied abroad in the United States during her university years.

Yamaguchi began to learn karate during her residence in the United States around the age of 7 years old, yearning to be like Jackie Chan. During college, she started training in Brazilian Jiu-Jitsu. After returning to Japan, she joined Butoku Kai. She currently serves as the leader of the Morishita branch.

In 2005, Yamaguchi entered into the Max Jiu-Jitsu Academy.

Mixed martial arts career

On  at Smackgirl 2007: Queens' Hottest Summer, Yamaguchi defeated Emi Tomimatsu by split decision, winning the final of the Next Cinderella Tournament 2007 in the lightweight division.

 It was just the fourth time that Tsuji had been taken to a decision.

Yamaguchi rebounded by winning her next two bouts in the inaugural Valkyrie women's featherweight tournament.

At Valkyrie 04, in her second match against Tsuji, Yamaguchi was once again the underdog, but she managed to defeat Tsuji with a rear naked choke in only 76 seconds. This was the first time that Tsuji was defeated by a fellow Japanese fighter and only the second time that she had been defeated in her MMA career. Yamaguchi became Valkyrie's Featherweight Champion in what is considered one of the biggest upsets in the history of women's mixed martial arts.

On , Yamaguchi faced Kyoko Takabayashi in a rematch of the 2009 featherweight tournament final and Yamaguchi's first defense of Valkyrie's featherweight title. Yamaguchi barely retained with a contentious majority draw in which the dissenting judge scored the fight in favor of Takabayashi at Valkyrie 08.

She defeated Sunaba by majority decision.

She defeated Naito by armbar submission in the first round.

She was defeated by unanimous decision.

She won the fight by split decision.

She was defeated by unanimous decision.

On , Yamaguchi faced Emi Tomimatsu in a rematch at Jewels 20th Ring. She defeated Tomimatsu by unanimous decision.

She was defeated by unanimous decision.

On , Yamaguchi faced Seo Ye Jung at Jewels 24th Ring. She defeated Jung by submission due to an armbar in the first round.

She was defeated by split decision.

Yamaguchi faced Julie Mezabarba as part of an alternate bout for the Atomweight World Grand-Prix at ONE Championship: Empower on September 3, 2021. She lost the bout via unanimous decision.

Yamaguchi faced Jihin Radzuan at  ONE: Bad Blood on February 11, 2022, as a late notice replacement for Jenelyn Olsim. She lost the bout via unanimous decision.

Submission grappling and shoot boxing career 

Yamaguchi has had a more successful run in shoot boxing. Yamaguchi won her next two bouts by decision. She participated in the shoot boxing Girls S-Cup 2010, defeating Samanta van Dole by technical submission (standing guillotine choke) and losing against Ai Takahashi by unanimous decision after an extra round.

On , Yamaguchi entered the 2011 Shoot Boxing Girls S-Cup tournament. She faced Mina in the opening round and was defeated by majority decision.

She defeated Namtarn Por Munagpetch and Lorena Klijn to advance to the final round, but lost to Rena Kubota via unanimous decision in the tournament final.

She was defeated by unanimous decision.

However, Peiling suffered an injury and Yamaguchi instead faced Chihiro Kira. She defeated Kira by unanimous decision.

Yamaguchi faced Danielle Kelly in a grappling match at ONE: X on March 26, 2022. They grappled to a draw after 12 minutes after neither could find the submission.

Mixed martial arts record

|-
|Loss
|align=center|
| Jihin Radzuan
| Decision (unanimous)
| ONE: Bad Blood
| 
|align=center|3
|align=center|5:00
| Kallang, Singapore
| 
|-
|Loss
|align=center|
| Julie Mezabarba
| Decision (unanimous)
| ONE: Empower
| 
|align=center|3
|align=center|5:00
| Kallang, Singapore
| 
|-
|Loss
|align=center|
|Denice Zamboanga
|Decision (unanimous) 
|ONE: King of the Jungle
|
|align=center|3
|align=center|5:00 
|Kallang, Singapore  
|
|-
|Win
|align=center| 21–11–1
|Jenny Huang
|Decision (unanimous)
|ONE: Century Part 2
||
|align=center| 3
|align=center| 5:00
|Tokyo, Japan 
|
|-
|Win
|align=center| 20–11–1
|Laura Balin
|Submission (Armbar)
| ONE: Enter the Dragon
||
|align=center| 1
|align=center| 3:46
|Kallang , Singapore
|
|-
|Win
|align=center| 19–11–1
|Kseniya Lachkova
|Submission (Armbar)
| ONE: A New Era
||
|align=center| 3
|align=center| 3:18
|Tokyo , Japan
|
|-
| Win
| align=center| 18–11–1
| Jomary Torres
| Decision (unanimous)
| ONE: Destiny of Champions
| 
| align=center| 3
| align=center| 5:00
| Kuala Lumpur, Malaysia 
| 
|-
| Loss
| align=center| 17–11–1
| Angela Lee
|Decision (unanimous)
| ONE: Unstoppable Dreams
| 
| align=center| 5
| align=center| 5:00
| Kallang, Singapore
| 
|-
| Win
| align=center| 17–10–1
| Gina Iniong
|Decision (unanimous)
| ONE: Immortal Pursuit
| 
| align=center| 3
| align=center| 5:00
| Kallang, Singapore
|
|-
| Win
| align=center| 16–10–1
| Jenny Huang
|Submission (rear-naked choke)
| ONE: Light of a Nation
| 
| align=center| 2
| align=center| 4:00
| Yangon, Myanmar 
|
|-
| Loss
| align=center| 15–10–1
| Istela Nunes
| Decision (split)
| ONE: Heroes of the World
| 
| align=center| 3
| align=center| 5:00
| Macau, China 
| 
|-
| Loss
| align=center| 15–9–1
| Angela Lee
| Decision (unanimous)
| ONE: Ascent to Power
| 
| align=center| 5
| align=center| 5:00
| Kallang, Singapore
| 
|-
| Win
| align=center| 15–8–1
| Satomi Takano
| TKO (punches)
| Deep Jewels 8
| 
| align=center| 2
| align=center| 4:57
| Tokyo, Japan
| 
|-
| Win
| align=center| 14–8–1
| Mina Kurobe
| Decision (unanimous)
| Deep Jewels 8
| 
| align=center| 2
| align=center| 5:00
| Tokyo, Japan
| 
|-
| Win
| align=center| 13–8–1
| Miyoko Kusaka
| KO (knee to the body)
| Deep Jewels 7
| 
| align=center| 1
| align=center| 0:44
| Tokyo, Japan
| 
|-
| Loss
| align=center| 12–8–1
| Ayaka Hamasaki
| Decision (unanimous)
| Deep - Dream Impact 2014: Omisoka Special 
| 
| align=center| 2
| align=center| 5:00
| Saitama, Japan
| 
|-
| Win
| align=center| 12–7–1
| Yukiko Seki
| Technical Submission (rear naked choke)
| Deep-Jewels 4
| 
| align=center| 1
| align=center| 3:17
| Tokyo, Japan
| 
|-
| Loss
| align=center| 11–7–1
| Gina Iniong 
| Decision (split)
| Pacific Xtreme Combat 43
| 
| align=center| 3
| align=center| 5:00
| National Capital Region, Philippines
| 
|-
| Loss
| align=center| 11–6–1
| Patricia Vidonic
| Decision (split)
| Pacific Xtreme Combat 40
| 
| align=center| 3
| align=center| 5:00
| Mangilao, Guam, United States
| 
|-
| Win
| align=center| 11–5–1
| Seo Ye Jung
| Submission (armbar)
| Jewels 24th Ring
| 
| align=center| 1
| align=center| 1:55
| Kabukicho, Tokyo, Japan
| 
|-
| Loss
| align=center| 10–5–1
| Megumi Fujii
| Decision (unanimous)
| Vale Tudo Japan 2012
| 
| align=center| 2
| align=center| 5:00
| Shibuya, Tokyo, Japan
| 
|-
| Win
| align=center| 10–4–1
| Emi Tomimatsu
| Decision (unanimous)
| Jewels 20th Ring
| 
| align=center| 2
| align=center| 5:00
| Koto, Tokyo, Japan
| 
|-
| Loss
| align=center| 9–4–1
| Katja Kankaanpää
| Decision (unanimous)
| Botnia Punishment 11: Kankaanpää vs. Yamaguchi
| 
| align=center| 3
| align=center| 5:00
| Seinäjoki, Finland
| 
|-
| Win
| align=center| 9–3–1
| Mika Nagano
| Decision (split)
| Jewels 17th Ring
| 
| align=center| 2
| align=center| 5:00
| Kabukicho, Tokyo, Japan
| 
|-
| Loss
| align=center| 8–3–1
| Seo Hee Ham
| Decision (unanimous)
| Jewels 15th Ring
| 
| align=center| 2
| align=center| 5:00
| Kabukicho, Tokyo, Japan
| 
|-
| Win
| align=center| 8–2–1
| Akiko Naito
| Submission (armbar)
| Pancrase: Impressive Tour 4
| 
| align=center| 1
| align=center| 3:52
| Koto, Tokyo, Japan
| 
|-
| Win
| align=center| 7–2–1
| Tomomi Sunaba
| Decision (majority)
| Pancrase: Impressive Tour 3
| 
| align=center| 2
| align=center| 5:00
| Koto, Tokyo, Japan
| 
|-
| Draw
| align=center| 6–2–1
| Kyoko Takabayashi
| Draw (majority)
| Valkyrie 08
| 
| align=center| 3
| align=center| 5:00
| Koto, Tokyo, Japan
| 
|-
| Win
| align=center| 6–2
| Yuka Tsuji
| Submission (rear-naked choke)
| Valkyrie 04
| 
| align=center| 1
| align=center| 1:16
| Koto, Tokyo, Japan
| 
|-
| Win
| align=center| 5–2
| Kyoko Takabayashi
| Decision (split)
| Cage Force & Valkyrie
| 
| align=center| 3
| align=center| 3:00
| Koto, Tokyo, Japan
| 
|-
| Win
| align=center| 4–2
| Emi Fujino
| Decision (unanimous)
| Valkyrie 02
| 
| align=center| 3
| align=center| 3:00
| Koto, Tokyo, Japan
| 
|-
| Loss
| align=center| 3–2
| Yuka Tsuji
| Decision (unanimous)
| Valkyrie 01
| 
| align=center| 3
| align=center| 3:00
| Koto, Tokyo, Japan
| 
|-
| Loss
| align=center| 3–1
| Emi Fujino
| Decision (split)
| Smackgirl 7th Anniversary: Starting Over
| 
| align=center| 2
| align=center| 5:00
| Bunkyo, Tokyo, Japan
| 
|-
| Win
| align=center| 3–0
| Emi Tomimatsu
| Decision (split)
| Smackgirl 2007: Queens' Hottest Summer
| 
| align=center| 2
| align=center| 5:00
| Bunkyo, Tokyo, Japan
| 
|-
| Win
| align=center| 2–0
| Saori Ishioka
| Submission (kneebar)
| Smackgirl-F 2007: The Next Cinderella 2007 2nd Stage
| 
| align=center| 2
| align=center| 1:24
| Bunkyo, Tokyo, Japan
| 
|-
| Win
| align=center| 1–0
| Anna Saito
| Submission (rear-naked choke)
| Smackgirl-F 2007: The Next Cinderella Tournament 2007 First Stage
| 
| align=center| 1
| align=center| 4:53
| Kabukicho, Tokyo, Japan
|

Submission grappling record

|-
| 
| Draw
|  Danielle Kelly
| ONE: X
| Kallang, Singapore
| Decision
| 1
| 12:00
| 0-2-1
| 
|-
| 
| Loss
|  Miku Matsumoto
| DEEP X03
| Tokyo, Japan
| Points (4-10)
| 2
| 4:00
| 0-2-0
| 
|-
| 
| Loss
|  Yasuko Mogi
| Abu Dhabi Combat Club Japan Trial final qualifier
| Tokyo, Japan
| Points (2-6)
| N/A
| N/A
| 0-1-0
| Women under-55 kg class - 1st round
|-
| colspan=10 | Legend:

Shoot boxing record

|-  style="background:#fbb;"
| 2015-08-21|| Loss||align=left| MIO || Shoot Boxing Girls S-Cup 2015 Japan Tournament, Semi Final|| Tokyo, Japan ||  Ext.R Decision (Unanimous) || 4 || 3:00|| 9-6-0
|-  style="background:#cfc;"
| 2015-08-21|| Win||align=left| Michi || Shoot Boxing Girls S-Cup 2015 Japan Tournament, Quarter Final|| Tokyo, Japan ||  Decision (Unanimous) || 4 || 3:00|| 9-5-0
|-  bgcolor="CCFFCC"
| 2013-08-03 || Win ||align=left| Chihiro Kira || Shoot Boxing Girls S-Cup 2013 || Tokyo, Japan || Decision (unanimous) || 3 || 3:00 || 8-5-0
|-  bgcolor="FFBBBB"
| 2013-06-23 || Loss ||align=left| Lorena Klijn || Shoot Boxing 2013: Act.3 || Tokyo, Japan || Decision (unanimous) || 3 || 3:00 || 7-5-0
|-  bgcolor="FFBBBB"
| 2012-08-25 || Loss ||align=left| Rena Kubota || Shoot Boxing Girls S-Cup 2012, final || Tokyo, Japan || Decision (unanimous) || 3 || 2:00 || 7-4-0
|-  bgcolor="CCFFCC"
| 2012-08-25 || Win ||align=left| Lorena Klijn || Shoot Boxing Girls S-Cup 2012, semi-finals || Tokyo, Japan || Decision (unanimous) || 4 (Ex.1) || 2:00 || 7-3-0
|-
! style=background:white colspan=9 |
|-
|-  bgcolor="CCFFCC"
| 2012-08-25 || Win ||align=left| Namtarn Por Munagpetch || Shoot Boxing Girls S-Cup 2012, first round || Tokyo, Japan || Decision (unanimous) || 4 (Ex.1) || 2:00 || 6-3-0
|-  bgcolor="FFBBBB"
| 2011-08-19 || Loss ||align=left| Mina || Shoot Boxing Girls S-Cup 2011, first round || Tokyo, Japan || Decision (majority) || 3 || 2:00 || 5-3-0
|-  bgcolor="FFBBBB"
| 2010-08-29 || Loss ||align=left| Ai Takahashi || Shoot Boxing Girls S-Cup 2010, semi-finals || Tokyo, Japan || Decision (unanimous) || 4 (Ex.1) || 2:00 || 5-2-0
|-  bgcolor="CCFFCC"
| 2010-08-29 || Win ||align=left| Samanta van Dole || Shoot Boxing Girls S-Cup 2010, first round || Tokyo, Japan || TKO (Technical submission, standing guillotine choke) || 3 || 1:45 || 5-1-0
|-
! style=background:white colspan=9 |
|-
|-  bgcolor="CCFFCC"
| 2010-06-06 || Win ||align=left| Ikue Tanimura || Shoot Boxing 25th anniversary series || Tokyo, Japan || Decision (unanimous) || 3 || 2:00 || 4-1-0
|-  bgcolor="CCFFCC"
| 2009-11-18 || Win ||align=left| Etsu Senchaigym || Shoot Boxing 2009: Bushido || Tokyo, Japan || Decision (unanimous) || 4 (Ex.1) || 2:00 || 3-1-0
|-  bgcolor="FFBBBB"
| 2009-08-23 || Loss ||align=left| Rena Kubota || Shoot Boxing Girls Tournament 2009 final || Tokyo, Japan || Decision (unanimous) || 3 || 2:00 || 2-1-0
|-  bgcolor="CCFFCC"
| 2009-08-23 || Win ||align=left| Madoka Okada || Shoot Boxing Girls Tournament 2009 semi-finals || Tokyo, Japan || Decision (unanimous) || 3 || 2:00 || 2-0-0
|-  bgcolor="CCFFCC"
| 2009-08-23 || Win ||align=left| Su Jeong Lim || Shoot Boxing Girls Tournament 2009 first round || Tokyo, Japan || Decision (unanimous) || 3 || 2:00 || 1-0-0
|-
| colspan=9 | Legend:

Championships and accomplishments

Mixed martial arts
Deep Jewels Atomweight Champion (one time)
Smackgirl-F The Next Cinderella Tournament 2007 Lightweight winner
Valkyrie Featherweight Tournament winner
Valkyrie Featherweight Champion
MMAJunkie.com
 2016 May Fight of the Month vs. Angela Lee

Shoot boxing
2009 Shoot Boxing Girls S-Cup runner-up
2012 Shoot Boxing Girls S-Cup runner-up

See also
List of current ONE fighters
List of female mixed martial artists
List of female kickboxers

References

External links

Profile at Fightergirls.com
Profile at shoot boxing 
Official blog 

1983 births
Strawweight mixed martial artists
Atomweight mixed martial artists
Living people
Japanese female mixed martial artists
Mixed martial artists utilizing karate
Mixed martial artists utilizing shootboxing
Mixed martial artists utilizing wrestling
Mixed martial artists utilizing Brazilian jiu-jitsu
Japanese female karateka
Japanese female kickboxers
Female Brazilian jiu-jitsu practitioners
Japanese practitioners of Brazilian jiu-jitsu
People awarded a black belt in Brazilian jiu-jitsu
Sportspeople from Tokyo